Andrew Spagrud (born November 2, 1985, in Saskatoon, Saskatchewan) is a basketball player from Canada, who played for the University of Saskatchewan Huskies in Saskatoon. He played professional basketball for the Sundsvall Dragons of the Swedish Ligan. Later (Nov 2010) he moved to Ostrava in the Czech republic to play for NH Ostrava of the Mattoni NBL. His current stats can be found on player stats.

Spagrud played at the University of Saskatchewan from 2003 to 2008. He was named the CIS National Freshman of the Year in 2003–04, and went on to earn All-Canadian honours the next four seasons. He was a First Team All-Canadian three times (2004–05, 2006–07, 2007–08) and a Second Team All-Canadian once (2005–06).

He is the all-time leading scorer (3826 points) and rebounder (1763 rebounds) at the University of Saskatchewan. He is also the leading scorer in Canada West Conference history (2182 points).

He began his professional career in 2009–10 with the Sundsvall Dragons.

References

External links
 Czech Basketball Federation
 NH Ostrava
 Mattoni NBL
 Andrew Spagrud's profile on Sweden Basketligan website
 Andrew Spagrud's profile at Huskiehoops.com
 Andrew Spagrud Youtube website

1985 births
Living people
Canadian men's basketball players
Saskatchewan Huskies basketball players
Sportspeople from Saskatoon
Basketball people from Saskatchewan
Canadian expatriate basketball people in Sweden